Leshi Singh  is an Indian Politician from JDU and senior member of the Bihar Legislative Assembly from the Dhamdaha seat in Bihar.

Political career 
She is a Minister in Nitish Kumar cabinet. Previously, Leshi was the Chairman of Bihar State Women Commission. In the year 2000, 2005 (Feb.), 2010, 2015, 2020 Bihar Assembly Elections, Leshi Singh won the Dhamdaha constituency of Bihar to become a Member of Legislative Assembly. She is the 5th term MLA from Dhamdaha (Purnia), winning by huge margin of approx. 34k votes.

Currently, she is the Food and Consumer Protection Minister in Government of Bihar. Leshi is considered one of the most senior leaders of the Janata Dal (United).

Personal life
She is the wife of Butan Singh, former district chief of Samata party and highly-dreaded ganglord.

References

Living people
Janata Dal (United) politicians
Bihar MLAs 2000–2005
Women members of the Bihar Legislative Assembly
Bihar MLAs 2010–2015
Bihar MLAs 2015–2020
People from Purnia district
21st-century Indian women politicians
21st-century Indian politicians
20th-century Indian women politicians
20th-century Indian politicians
Bihar MLAs 2020–2025
1974 births